A purok is an informal division within a barangay in the Philippines. While not officially considered a local government unit (LGU), a purok often serves as a unit for delivering services and administration within a barangay.

A purok is typically composed of twenty to fifty or more households, depending on the particular geographical location and cluster of houses. The term purok is often applied to a neighborhood (zone) within an urbanized barangay, or a portion (district) of a less densely populated, but still relatively geographically compact, barangay. This contrasts with the sitio, which is usually a cluster of households (hamlet) in a more dispersed, rural barangay.

If created and given a mandate by an ordinance of the barangay, municipality, or city, a purok could perform government functions under the coordination and supervision of their local officials. Sometimes, a member of the Sangguniang Barangay (Barangay Council) may be recognized as the leader of their purok.

New barangays are often created by officially enumerating which puroks and/or sitios are included within the territory. On rare occasions, a purok may also be enumerated in the creation of a municipality, as in the case of Shariff Saydona Mustapha, Maguindanao where the puroks of Libutan East and Pagatin I were directly named as one of the constituent parts of the new municipality. These two puroks were later recognized as full-fledged barangays by the Philippine Statistics Authority in early 2010.

See also 

 Sitio 
 Poblacion

References 

 
Barangays of the Philippines
Subdivisions of the Philippines
Tagalog words and phrases